Łaznów  is a village in the administrative district of Gmina Rokiciny, within Tomaszów Mazowiecki County, Łódź Voivodeship, in central Poland.

References

Villages in Tomaszów Mazowiecki County
Piotrków Governorate
Łódź Voivodeship (1919–1939)